Looting is the act of stealing, or the taking of goods by force, typically in the midst of a military, political, or other social crisis, such as war, natural disasters (where law and civil enforcement are temporarily ineffective), or rioting.  The proceeds of all these activities can be described as booty, loot, plunder, spoils, or pillage.

During modern-day armed conflicts, looting is prohibited by international law, and constitutes a war crime.

After disasters
During a disaster, police and military forces are sometimes unable to prevent looting when they are overwhelmed by humanitarian or combat concerns, or they cannot be summoned because of damaged communications infrastructure. Especially during natural disasters, many civilians may find themselves forced to take what does not belong to them in order to survive. How to respond to that and where the line between unnecessary "looting" and necessary "scavenging" lies are often dilemmas for governments. In other cases, looting may be tolerated or even encouraged by governments for political or other reasons, including religious, social or economic ones.

History

In armed conflict 

Looting by a victorious army during war has been a common practice throughout recorded history. Foot soldiers viewed plunder as a way to supplement an often-meagre income and transferred wealth became part of the celebration of victory. In the wake of the Napoleonic Wars and particularly after World War II, norms against wartime plunder became widely accepted.

In the upper ranks, the proud exhibition of the loot plundered formed an integral part of the typical Roman triumph, and Genghis Khan was not unusual in proclaiming that the greatest happiness was "to vanquish your enemies... to rob them of their wealth".

In warfare in ancient times, the spoils of war included the defeated populations, which were often enslaved. Women and children might become absorbed into the victorious country's population, as concubines, eunuchs and slaves. In other pre-modern societies, objects made of precious metals were the preferred target of war looting, largely because of their ease of portability. In many cases, looting offered an opportunity to obtain treasures and works of art that otherwise would not have been obtainable. Beginning in the early modern period and reaching its peak in the New Imperialism era, European colonial powers frequently looted areas they captured during military campaigns against non-European states. In the 1930s, and even more so during the Second World War, Nazi Germany engaged in large-scale and organized looting of art and property, particularly in Nazi-occupied Poland.

Looting, combined with poor military discipline, has occasionally been an army's downfall since troops who have dispersed to ransack an area may become vulnerable to counter-attack. In other cases, for example, the Wahhabi sack of Karbala in 1801 or 1802, loot has contributed to further victories for an army. Not all looters in wartime are conquerors; the looting of Vistula Land by the retreating Imperial Russian Army in 1915 was among the factors sapping the loyalty of Poles to Russia. Local civilians can also take advantage of a breakdown of order to loot public and private property, as took place at the Iraq Museum in the course of the Iraq War in 2003. Lev Nikolayevich Tolstoy's novel War and Peace describes widespread looting by Moscow's citizens before Napoleon's troops entered the city in 1812, along with looting by French troops elsewhere.

In 1990 and 1991, during the Gulf War, Saddam Hussein's soldiers caused significant damage to both Kuwaiti and Saudi infrastructure. They also stole from private companies and homes.  In April 2003, looters broke into the National Museum of Iraq, and thousands of artefacts remain missing.

Syrian conservation sites and museums were looted during the Syrian Civil War, with items being sold on the international black market. Reports from 2012 suggested that the antiquities were being traded for weapons by the various combatants.

Prohibited under international law 
Both customary international law and international treaties prohibit pillage in armed conflict. The Lieber Code, the Brussels Declaration (1874), and the Oxford Manual have recognized the prohibition against pillage. The Hague Conventions of 1899 and 1907 (modified in 1954) obliges military forces not only to avoid the destruction of enemy property but also to provide for its protection. Article 8 of the Statute of the International Criminal Court provides that in international warfare, "pillaging a town or place, even when taken by assault", is a war crime. In the aftermath of World War II, a number of war criminals were prosecuted for pillage. The International Criminal Tribunal for the Former Yugoslavia (1993–2017) brought several prosecutions for pillage.

The Fourth Geneva Convention of 1949 explicitly prohibits the looting of civilian property during wartime.

Theoretically, to prevent such looting, unclaimed property is moved to the custody of the Custodian of Enemy Property, to be handled until returned to its owners.

Modern Conflicts 
Despite international prohibitions against the practice of looting, the ease with which it can be done means that it remains relatively common, particularly during outbreaks of civil unrest during which rules of war may not yet apply. The 2011 Egyptian Revolution, for example, caused a significant increase in the looting of antiquities from archaeological sites in Egypt, as the government lost the ability to protect the sites. Other acts of modern looting, such as the looting and destruction of artifacts from the National Museum of Iraq by Islamic State militants, can be used as an easy way to express contempt for the concept of rules of war altogether.

In the case of a sudden change in a country or region's government, it can be difficult to determine what constitutes looting as opposed to a new government taking custody of the property in question. This can be especially difficult if the new government is only partially recognized at the time the property is moved, as was the case during the 2021 Taliban offensive, during which a number of artifacts and a large amount of property of former government officials who had fled the country fell into the hands of the Taliban before they were recognized as the legitimate government of Afghanistan by other countries. Further looting and burning of civilian homes and villages has been defended by the Taliban as within their right as the legitimate government of Afghanistan.

Looting can also be common in cases where civil unrest is contained largely within the borders of a country or during peacetime. Riots in the wake of the 2020 George Floyd protests in numerous American cities led to increased amounts of looting, as looters took advantage of the delicate political situation and civil unrest surrounding the riots themselves.

During the ongoing Kashmir conflict, looting of Kashmiris trapped between the Indian and Pakistani militarized zones is common and widespread.

In 2022, international observers accused Russia of engaging in large scale looting during the Russo-Ukrainian War, reporting the widespread looting of everything from food to industrial equipment. Despite the publication of numerous photos and videos by Ukrainian journalists and civilians, numerous Russian commanders, such as Gareo Novalsky, have denied these claims. International observers have theorized that this looting is either the result of direct orders, despite to Russia's claims to the contrary, or due to Russian soldiers not being issued with adequate food and other resources by their commanders.

Archaeological removals

The term "looting" is also sometimes used to refer to antiquities being removed from countries by unauthorized people, either domestic people breaking the law seeking monetary gain or foreign nations, which are usually more interested in prestige or previously, "scientific discovery". An example  might be the removal of the contents of Egyptian tombs that were transported to museums across the West. Whether that constitutes "looting" is a debated point, with other parties pointing out that the Europeans were usually given permission of some sort, and many of the treasures would not have been discovered at all if the Europeans had not funded and organized the expeditions or digs that located them. Many such antiquities have already been returned to their country of origin voluntarily.

Looting of industry
As part of World War II reparations, Soviet forces systematically plundered the Soviet occupation zone of Germany, including the Recovered Territories, which later transferred to Poland. The Soviets sent valuable industrial equipment, infrastructure and whole factories to the Soviet Union.

Many factories in the rebels' zone of Aleppo during the Syrian Civil War were reported as being plundered and their assets transferred abroad.  Agricultural production and electronic power plants were also seized, to be sold elsewhere.

Gallery

See also

 Arson
 Banditry
 Conflict resource
 Depredation
 Hijacking
 Piracy
 Prize of war
 Vandalism

References

Sources 
 Abudu, Margaret, et al., "Black Ghetto Violence: A Case Study Inquiry into the Spatial Pattern of Four Los Angeles Riot Event-Types", 44 Social Problems 483 (1997)
 Curvin, Robert and Bruce Porter (1979), Blackout Looting
 Dynes, Russell & Enrico L. Quarantelli, "What Looting in Civil Disturbances Really Means", in Modern Criminals 177 (James F. Short Jr., ed., 1970)
 Green, Stuart P., "Looting, Law, and Lawlessness", 81 Tulane Law Review 1129 (2007)
 Mac Ginty, Roger, "Looting in the Context of Violent Conflict: A Conceptualisation and Typology", 25 Third World Quarterly 857 (2004). .
 Stewart, James, "Corporate War Crimes: Prosecuting Pillage of Natural Resources", 2010

External links 
 

 
Property crimes